Peter V. Sperling (born 1960) is one of the 400 wealthiest Americans, and the son of John Sperling.  He was the Chairman of Apollo Group, and a co-founder and chairman of CallWave, Inc. He earned his Bachelor of Arts degree in economics from the University of California at Santa Barbara and his MBA from the University of Phoenix.

Sperling sponsored and financially backed Proposition 7 of California's November 2008 general election.

In 2021, Mr. Sperling placed one of his homes up for sale, with an asking price of $74 million.

References

1960 births
Living people
American billionaires
American chairpersons of corporations
University of California, Santa Barbara alumni
University of Phoenix alumni
Businesspeople from Phoenix, Arizona
20th-century American businesspeople